George Raphael Fleming (5 August 1850 – 13 December 1909) was a Scottish rugby union international player. He was born in Cathcart, Renfrewshire (now a suburb of Glasgow).

Rugby Union career

Amateur career

Fleming played as a forward for Glasgow Academicals.

Provincial career

He represented Glasgow District against Edinburgh District in the world's first provincial match, the 'inter-city', on 23 November 1872, and also played in the 5 December 1874 match.

He also represented the West of Scotland District, captaining the side.

International career

He represented Scotland in the 1874–75 Home Nations rugby union matches and 1875–76 Home Nations rugby union matches.

References

1850 births
1909 deaths
Glasgow Academicals rugby union players
Glasgow District (rugby union) players
Presidents of the Scottish Rugby Union
Rugby union forwards
Rugby union players from Glasgow
Scotland international rugby union players
Scottish rugby union players
West of Scotland District (rugby union) players